Paeonia daurica subsp. mlokosewitschii, the golden peony or Caucasian peony, is a species of flowering plant native to the Caucasus Mountains in Azerbaijan, Georgia, and Dagestan, where it grows on rocky slopes in oak, hornbeam, or beech forests. The plant is sometimes nicknamed Molly the witch, a humorous mispronunciation of the species name, which most people find difficult to pronounce. It was formerly regarded as a separate species, Paeonia mlokosewitschii, but in 2002, the Chinese botanist Hong Deyuan reduced it to a subspecies of Paeonia daurica.

Description
In spring it bears large, single, bowl-shaped lemon-yellow flowers  in diameter, the ovary pubescent, the two to four carpels white, pink or yellow, and the stamen filaments yellow-green. In cultivation in the UK it has been given the Royal Horticultural Society’s Award of Garden Merit.

Taxonomy
Paeonia daurica subsp. mlokosewitschii was first described as a species, Paeonia mlokosewitchii, by Aleksandr Lomakin in 1897. It was named after the Polish botanist Ludwik Młokosiewicz who first discovered it.  In 2002, the Chinese botanist Hong Deyuan reduced it to a subspecies of Paeonia daurica.

References

External links

Caucasian Representatives of the Genus Paeonia: 5. Paeonia mlokosewitschii
Ornamental Plants From Russia: Paeonia mlokosewitschii
Josef J. Halda and James W. Waddick. The Genus Paeonia. Timber Press. 
A. Huxley [ed.] (1992). The New RHS Dictionary of Gardening 3: 438. Macmillan. 
Paeonia — Pacific Bulb Society
BBC Gardener's Question Time Factsheet (1 July 2001)

daurica subsp. mlokosewitschii
Plant subspecies
Flora of the Caucasus